meat.your.maker is the debut studio album by Hate Dept., released in October 1994 by 21st Circuitry.

Reception
Keyboard praised meat.your.maker for being "raw and accessible" and the band for experimenting with their arrangements. Aiding & Abetting gave it a mixed review, saying "there is much more texture underlying everything than the current trend-setters have" but "as aggressive industrial goes, this is pretty wimpy musically' and that "the beats often sound like they came off a Casio sampler, and the guitars are never allowed to really dominate." Factsheet Five said "although Hate Dept. uses some rather trite subject matter for industrial songs (e.g. child pornography, sex aversion, samples from Blade Runner), they do their thing so well that I just don't care."

Track listing

Personnel
Adapted from the meat.your.maker liner notes.

Hate Dept.
 Coby Bassett – guitar, vocals
 Dean Love – keyboards, vocals
 Steven Ortiz – drums, vocals
 Steven Seibold – lead vocals, programming, keyboards, guitar, production

Additional performers
 James Agnew – keyboards, guitar, vocals
 Charles Hunt – drums, vocals
 Rob Robinson – keyboards, guitar
 Robert Tomchak – keyboards, vocals
 Timothy Wiles (as Q) – keyboards, vocals

Production and design
 Curium Design – design

Release history

References

External links 
 
 Meat.Your.Maker at Discogs (list of releases)

1994 debut albums
Hate Dept. albums
21st Circuitry albums